Sanma may refer to

 Sanma Province, Vanuatu
 Sanma Akashiya, a Japanese comedian
 Sanma (サンマ), the Japanese name for Pacific saury
 Three player mahjong in Japanese